Bellator 275: Mousasi vs. Vanderford was a mixed martial arts event produced by Bellator MMA that took place on February 25, 2022, at the 3Arena in Dublin, Ireland.

Background 
In the main event, Gegard Mousasi defended his Middleweight title against undefeated Austin Vanderford. Vanderford sealed his spot as the No. 1 middleweight contender in May 2021 when he defeated Fabian Edwards by unanimous decision Bellator 259, which was also his fifth win in a row with Bellator. Mousasi is coming off his first title defense against John Salter in August 2021 at Bellator 264, where Mousasi dominated the bout before finishing the bout via third-round TKO with punches. Mousasi, a former Strikeforce champ who spent four years in the UFC, is on a three-fight winning streak and has won 11 out of 12 fights dating back to February 2016.

A middleweight bout between Fabian Edwards and Marian Dimitrov was scheduled for this event. However, the bout was scrapped a week before for unknown reason. Edwards was rebooked against Lyoto Machida at Bellator London.

A lightweight bout between Peter Queally and Kane Mousah and welterweight bout between Stefano Paternò and Luca Poclit were expected to take place at the event. However, Queally and Paternò both pulled out off their bouts due to injury.

At the weigh-ins, Jamie Hay missed weight for his bout, weighing in at 146.8 pounds, .8 pounds over the featherweight non-title fight limit. The bout proceeded at catchweight and Hay was fined a percentage of his purse, which went to his opponent Lee Hammond.

Results

See also 

 2022 in Bellator MMA
 List of Bellator MMA events
 List of current Bellator fighters
 Bellator MMA Rankings

References 

Bellator MMA events
Events in Dublin (city)
2022 in mixed martial arts
2022 in Irish sport
Mixed martial arts in Ireland
Sports competitions in Ireland